The 1972 National Indoor Championships – Singles was an event of the 1972 National Indoor Championships tennis tournament held at the Hampton Roads Coliseum in Hampton, Virginia in the United States from February 28 through March 5, 1972. Ilie Năstase was the defending champion. Stan Smith won the singles title, defeating Ilie Năstase 6–3, 6–2, 6–7(3–5), 6–4 in the final.

Draw

Finals

Top half

Bottom half

References

External links
 ITF tournament edition details

Tennis in Virginia
National Indoor Championships